My Husband's Not Gay is a television documentary aired by TLC. The show follows four Mormon couples in Salt Lake City, Utah, whose husbands are attracted to men. The couples explain that while the men feel attraction to other men, which they refer to as Same Sex Attraction (SSA), they do not act on it and are therefore not homosexuals.

Controversy 
A Change.org petition drew over 100,000 supporters to ask TLC to pull the program because, "TLC is ... sending the message that being gay is something that can and ought to be changed, or that you should reject your sexual orientation by marrying someone of the opposite sex." Objectors stated that by airing a television special about this belief, TLC was implicitly endorsing it, a form of bigotry.

References

External links 
 

2015 American television series debuts
2015 American television series endings
American documentary television films
TLC (TV network) original programming
2010s American LGBT-related television series
2010s American reality television series
2010s LGBT-related reality television series
American LGBT-related reality television series
Gay-related television shows
Conversion therapy
LGBT-related controversies in television
Works about LGBT and Mormonism
Documentary films about Utah
Films shot in Salt Lake City